Pterolebias is a genus of killifish from the family Rivulidae which are native to temporary swamps and ponds in South America. It includes two groups, which sometimes are regarded as separate genera: Pterolebias (sensu stricto) from the southern Amazon and Paraguay (including the Pantanal) river basins, and Gnatholebias from the Orinoco (including the Llanos) river basin.

Species
There are four recognized species in Pterolebias according to FishBase, but two of these are sometimes placed in a separate genus, Gnatholebias. The two groups are relatively distantly related and if kept in a single genus Pterolebias is paraphyletic.

 Pterolebias (sensu stricto)
 Pterolebias longipinnis Garman, 1895 (Longfin killie)
 Pterolebias phasianus W. J. E. M. Costa, 1988
 Gnatholebias
 Pterolebias hoignei Thomerson, 1974
 Pterolebias zonatus G. S. Myers, 1935

References

Rivulidae
Freshwater fish genera
Taxa named by Samuel Garman